Gilbert Hage (born in Beirut, Lebanon, 1966) is a Lebanese photographer. He studied at the Université Saint-Esprit de Kaslik and teaches there since 1990. He also teaches at the Académie Libanaise des Beaux-Arts ALBA. He sometimes collaborates with curator and researcher Ghada Waked, his wife, and is co-publisher and co-editor, with Jalal Toufic, of Underexposed Books.

Work

In 2004, he introduced Ici et Maintenant (Here and now), an encyclopedia like collection of large scale portraits of Lebanese citizens aged 18–30, all posing in the same position and looking directly at the camera.

Gilbert Hage took advantage of cell phones cameras to take shots of women’s cleavage in his series Phone[Ethics] that was part of the 2011 Rencontres d'Arles.

In the Aftermath of the 2006 Lebanon War, Hage documented buildings in Beirut's southern suburbs that were bombed, in a frontal and monumental framing.

In 2009, Gilbert Hage produced a series of Eleven Views of Mount Ararat. Referring to Hokusai’s Thirty-six Views of Mount Fuji, the photos depict representations of the famous mountains in homes of the Armenian community in Lebanon.

In 2018, Gibert Hage was selected to be part of The Place That Remains, the first national Pavilion of Lebanon curated by Hala Younes at the Venice Biennale of Architecture

Publications

 Here And Now (Alba University of Balamand, 2017)
 Ana, Berthe, Emmanuelle...... (Underexposed, 2013)
 I Hated You Already Because Of The Lies I Had Told You (Underexposed, 2013)
 242cm2 (Underexposed, 2012)
 With Strings Attached (underexposed, 2012)
 Toufican Ruins? With Jalal Toufic (Underexposed, 2010)
 Screening Berlin (Underexposed, 2010)
 Eleven views of Mount Ararat (Underexposed, 2009)
 Ici et maintenant (Galerie Tanit, 2005)
 Beirut (Galerie Alice Mogabgab, 2004)
 28 Roses b/w (Galerie Alice Mogabgab, 1999)

Selected exhibitions

Solo exhibitions

 Galerie Tanit, Beirut, 2017
Galerie Tanit, Munich, 2012
 Espace Kettaneh Kunigk, Beirut, 2012
 French Cultural Center, Beirut, 2010
 Espace Kettaneh Kunigk, Beirut, 2009
 University of Balamand, 2006
 Espace SD, Beirut, 2004
 Galerie Alice Mogabgab, Beirut, 2004
 Galerie Tanit, Munich, 2004
 Galerie Alice Mogabgab, Beirut, 2002
 Galerie Alice Mogabgab, Beirut, 1999

Group exhibitions
 Third Biennale of Contemporary Arab Photographers, Arab World Institute, Paris, 2019
 Across Boundaries. Focus on Lebanese Photography, curated by Tarek Nahas, Beirut Art Fair 2018
 The Place that Remains, Lebanese Pavilion, 16th Venice Biennale of Architecture, 2018
 Arts Santa Monica, Barcelona, 2013
 Katara, Doha, 2012
 Foto Museum, Anvers, 2012
 Subtitled-Royal College Of Art,  London, 2011
 Thessaloniki Museum of Photography, Thessaloniki, October 2011
 Rencontres d'Arles, Arles, 2011
 Sharjah Biennial, Sharjah, 2011
 White Box,  Munich, 2010
 Kunsthal_Rotterdam, 2009
 Kunsthalle, Vienna, 2007
 Casa arabe, Madrid, 2007
 Institute of contemporary art, Dunaujvaros, 2007
 Arabise me, Victoria & Albert Museum,  London, 2006 -
 Out of Beirut, Modern Art Oxford, 2006
 Haus der Kulturen der Welt, Berlin, 2005
 Mantes la jolie, 2004
 Vidéo Brazil, São Paulo, 2003
 Galerie V+A, Berlin, 2002

References

External links
Website of Gilbert Hage

Lebanese photographers
Artists from Beirut
1966 births
Living people
Holy Spirit University of Kaslik alumni
Academic staff of the Holy Spirit University of Kaslik
Mount Ararat